Nogometni klub Crikvenica or simply NK Crikvenica is a Croatian football club based in the northern Adriatic town of Crikvenica. They play in the 3. HNL – West, the third tier of Croatian football.

References

External links
Official website 

Football clubs in Croatia
Football clubs in Primorje-Gorski Kotar County
Association football clubs established in 1919
1919 establishments in Croatia